Tabor Antislavery Historic District is a historic district on Park, Center, Orange & Elm Streets in Tabor, Iowa.

The area was largely settled in 1853 and many mid-19th century revival buildings survive. The district includes the Todd House and the Public Square (Tabor City Park). This area was the home to several notable abolitionists, including Rev. John Todd. John Brown visited the area during his raids in the 1850s and camped in the square.  It was also used by Tabor College (1853–1927) for recreational purposes.  The area was added to the National Register of Historic Places in 2007.

See also
Todd House

References

National Register of Historic Places in Fremont County, Iowa
Houses on the National Register of Historic Places in Iowa
Geography of Fremont County, Iowa
Houses in Fremont County, Iowa
Historic districts on the National Register of Historic Places in Iowa
Underground Railroad in Iowa